is a Japanese Independent film director, screenwriter, actor and calligrapher. He gained media attention when he was arrested and charged on suspicion of paying a 17-year-old girl for sexual services in March 2006.

Works
Endress On The Road -  (2003)
Firstlove On The Little Beach -  (2004)
For Every Fukui Revolution -  (2005)

See also
Prostitution of children
Enjo kōsai
List of Japanese film directors
List of Japanese actors

References

External links
Morikawa's official website (Japanese)
--- WEB --- kaigyoh.com - Calligraphy "KAIGYOH" directed by Morikawa Yoichiro (Japanese and English)

1979 births
Living people
Japanese film directors
Japanese male actors
Japanese calligraphers
People from Fukui (city)
Actors from Fukui Prefecture
Writers from Fukui Prefecture
Artists from Fukui Prefecture